Ghulam Haider is a male Muslim given name. Notable people with the name include:

Bakshi Ghulam Haider  (died 1828), Indian soldier
Ghulam Haider (composer) (1908–1953), Indian/Pakistani composer and music director
Ghulam Haider Gagroo (1912–1975), Kashmiri poet
Ghulam Haidar Rasuli (1919–1978), Afghan politician
Ghulam Haider Hamidi (1945–2011), Afghan politician
Ghulam Haider Wyne (1950–1993), Pakistani politician
Ghulam Haider (cricketer) (born 1997), Pakistani cricketer

See also
Ghulam Haider Khan High School, school in Kabul, Afghanistaan

Arabic masculine given names
compound given names